The Tunisian football champions are the annual winners of the highest association football competition in Tunisia. The history of the Tunisian football championship is complex and reflects the This list summarizes the record of champions since 1907.

Champions

Under the Rule of the USFSA (1909–21)

Under the rule of LTFA (1921–1955)

After Independence (1956–present)

Total Tunisian Ligue Professionnelle 1 titles won

Performance by club

By club

 Teams in Bold compete in 2022–23 Ligue 1.
 Teams in Italique are Defunct.

Notes

References

External links 

 League at fifa.com
 RSSSF competition history
 Tunisian Ligue 1 - Hailoosport.com (Arabic)
 Tunisian Ligue 1 - Hailoosport.com

Tunisian Ligue Professionnelle 1
Football in Tunisia
National association football champions